Lamé is a type of fabric woven or knit with thin ribbons of metallic fiber wrapped around natural or synthetic fibers like silk, nylon, or spandex (for added stretch), as opposed to guipé, where the ribbons are wrapped around a fiber yarn. It is classically gold or silver in color; sometimes copper lamé is seen. In current day, almost all lamé is made with synthetic metalized fibers instead of true metallic yarn, and is available in any color. Common variants used in the fashion and costume industries are liquid lamé, tissue lamé, hologram lamé and pearl lamé. 

An issue with lamé is that it is subject to seam or yarn slippage, making it less than ideal for garments with frequent usage. The wrapped fibers can be coated in plastic to increase strength and to prevent tarnishing. Lamé is often used in evening and dress wear and in theatrical and dance costumes. It is commonly used in futuristic costumes and spacesuits for science fiction television, films, and performances.

Lamé is also used for its conductive properties in the sport of fencing to make the overjackets (called lamés) that allow touches to be scored.

See also
Cloth of gold

Notes 

Knitted fabrics
Woven fabrics